1H-Phenalene, often called simply phenalene is a polycyclic aromatic hydrocarbon (PAH).  Like many PAHs, it is an atmospheric pollutant formed during the combustion of fossil fuels. It is the parent compound for the phosphorus-containing phosphaphenalenes.

Reactions 
Phenalene is deprotonated by potassium methoxide to give the phenalenyl anion.

See also
 Zethrene
 Cyclopentadiene

References

Polycyclic aromatic hydrocarbons
Tricyclic compounds